The Mojave phone booth was a lone telephone booth in what is now the Mojave National Preserve in California.

Mojave phone booth may also refer to:

 Mojave Phone Booth (band), an electronic rock band and spinoff of Snake River Conspiracy
 Mojave Phone Booth (film), a 2006 film about the phone booth directed by John Putch